Xena: Warrior Princess has been referred to as a pop cultural phenomenon and feminist and lesbian icon. The television series, which employed pop culture references as a frequent humorous device, has itself become a frequent pop culture reference in video games, comics and television shows, and has been frequently parodied and spoofed.

Xena: Warrior Princess has been credited by many, including Buffy the Vampire Slayer creator Joss Whedon, with blazing the trail for a new generation of female action heroes such as Buffy, Max of Dark Angel, Sydney Bristow of Alias, and the Bride in Quentin Tarantino's Kill Bill. After serving as Lucy Lawless's stunt double on Xena, stunt woman Zoë E. Bell was recruited to be Uma Thurman's stunt double in Kill Bill. By helping to pave the way for female action heroes in television and film, "Xena" also strengthened the stunt woman profession.

Xena and Gabrielle's relationship (see Influence on the lesbian community) has been cited as one of the reasons why the series has been so popular, coupled with the denials of her character's lesbianism from Lawless while the series was running. Former United States of America (U.S.) Secretary of State Condoleezza Rice was nicknamed "Warrior Princess" by her staff.

Xena: Warrior Princess in contemporary culture

Literature

One of the running jokes in the Animorphs series of books is Marco's continual comparison of Rachel to Xena, referring to her daredevil nature and her lust for battle.

Astronomy
In January 2005, the team that discovered the dwarf planet  nicknamed it "Xena" in honor of the TV character. On October 1 the same year, the team announced that  had a moon, which they had nicknamed "Gabrielle". The objects were officially named Eris and Dysnomia by the International Astronomical Union on September 13, 2006. Although the official names have legitimate roots in Greek mythology, Dysnomia is also Greek for "lawlessness", perpetuating the link with Lucy Lawless.

Costume donation
In 2006, Lucy Lawless donated her personal Xena costume to the Museum of American History. In an interview the same year with Smithsonian magazine, she was asked the question "Was the Warrior Princess outfit comfortable?" and she responded:

Fandom and unofficial sequels

Fan fiction
The popularity of Xena has led to websites, online discussion forums, works of Xena fan fiction and several unofficial fan-made productions. Members of the Xena fandom have written numerous fanfiction stories of the series. In January 1998, there were a total of 1.598 works of fan fiction going through the network. The fans have popularized the term altfic to refer to fan fiction about loving relationships between women. Many believe that the term slash refers only to relationships between men and does not truly describe the romantic fan fiction about Xena and Gabrielle; they prefer the term altfic. In honor of the character of Gabrielle, fan fiction writers of the series were dubbed bards.

A special type of Xena fan fiction is Uber, or Uberfic, a term coined in 1997 by Kym Taborn, the website Whoosh.org fan. Uberfic are stories in which Xena, Gabrielle, and other characters appear in different cultures and eras, from prehistory to the distant future, through reincarnation or supernatural means. Stories like these began drawing on the episode set in Macedonia, The Xena Scrolls, starring descendants of Xena, Gabrielle and Joxer living in the 1940s. Subsequent episodes of the series had the characters appearing in various incarnations Xena, Gabrielle and Joxer in India and the United States.

Once the series ended, several virtual seasons were created by fans and released on the Internet, continuing the plot from the end of the series. These include virtual seasons' subtext. In addition, the series has inspired a variety of fan artwork, ranging from paintings to drawings to computer designs, as well as handmade crafts and cosplay.

Influence on the lesbian community

Xena has enjoyed a particular cult status in the lesbian community. Some of the lesbian fan base sees Xena and Gabrielle as a couple and has embraced them as role models and lesbian icons. A group called The Marching Xenas has participated in many gay and lesbian pride parades.

A subject of much interest and debate among viewers is the question of whether Xena and Gabrielle are lovers. The issue is left deliberately ambiguous by the writers during most of the show. Jokes, innuendo, and other subtle evidence of a romantic relationship between Xena and Gabrielle is referred to as "lesbian subtext" or simply "subtext" by fans. The issue of the true nature of the Xena/Gabrielle relationship caused intense shipping debates in the fandom, which turned especially impassioned due to spillover from real-life debates about same-sex sexuality and gay rights.

Many fans felt that the sexual nature of Xena and Gabrielle's relationship was cemented by an interview given by Lucy Lawless to Lesbian News magazine in 2003. Lawless stated that after the series finale, where Gabrielle revives Xena with a mouth-to-mouth water transfer filmed to look like a full kiss, she had come to believe that Xena and Gabrielle's relationship was "definitely gay...there was always a 'well, she might be or she might not be' but when there was that drip of water passing between their lips in the very final scene, that cemented it for me. Now it wasn't just that Xena was bisexual and kinda liked her gal pal and they kind of fooled around sometimes, it was 'Nope, they're married, man'."

The Xena fandom also popularized the term Altfic (from "alternative fiction") to refer to same-sex romantic fan fiction. Many fans felt the term slash fiction carried the connotation of being about male/male couples only and was not a good description for romantic fan fiction about Xena and Gabrielle.

Shipping wars
The Xena: Warrior Princess fandom often saw nasty "shipping wars" that turned especially intense due to spillover from real-life debates about same-sex sexuality and gay rights.

Shortly after the 1995 debut of the action/fantasy series about a woman warrior seeking redemption for a dark past, fans started discussing the possibility of a relationship between Xena and her sidekick and best friend Gabrielle. Toward the end of the first season, the show's producers began to play to this perception by deliberately inserting usually humorous lesbian innuendo into some episodes. The show acquired a cult following in the lesbian community. However, Xena had a number of male love interests as well, and from the first season she had an adversarial but sexually charged dynamic with Ares, the God of War, who frequently tried to win her over as his "Warrior Queen."

In a 10-year retrospective of the show in Salon.com, journalist Cathy Young wrote:

In 2000, during the airing of the controversial fifth season, the intensity and sometimes nastiness of the "shipping wars" in the Xena fandom was chronicled (from a non-subtexter's point of view) by Australian artist Nancy Lorenz in an article titled "The Discrimination in the Xenaverse" in the online Xenaverse magazine Whoosh! and the flood of the letters it generated in response.

The wars did not abate after the series came to an end in 2001. In January 2003, Lucy Lawless, the star of Xena: Warrior Princess, told Lesbian News magazine that after watching the series finale (in which Gabrielle revived Xena with a mouth-to-mouth water transfer filmed to look like a full kiss) she had come to believe that Xena and Gabrielle's relationship was "definitely gay."

In March 2005, one-time Xena screenwriter Katherine Fugate, an outspoken supporter of the Xena/Gabrielle pairing, posted a statement on her website appealing for tolerance in the fandom:

See also
 Buffy the Vampire Slayer in popular culture
 List of female action heroes
 Woman warrior

References

External links
 Xena Mentions
 Michelle Erica Green, "Xenademia: The Warrior Princess Goes To College"
 Greece, Rome, and Popular Culture Then and Now - "The unofficial guest of honor in this Room is, of course, Xena, who with Hercules has combined the classical world with modern pop culture camp -- and found enormous success."

Popular culture
United States in popular culture
Classical mythology in popular culture
Television shows in popular culture
Television fandom
Lesbian culture